Chionanthus ramiflorus (syn. Linociera ramiflora (Roxb.) Wall.), commonly known as northern olive or native olive, is a species of shrubs and trees, of the flowering plant family Oleaceae. They grow naturally in India, Nepal, northeastern Australia (Queensland), New Guinea, the Philippines, southern China and Taiwan.

Sometimes the species is treated in the segregate genus Linociera, though this does not differ from Chionanthus in any character other than leaf persistence, not a taxonomically significant character.

The 1889 book 'The Useful Native Plants of Australia' records that "The fruit of this plant is the food of the jagged-tailed bower-bird (Preonodura Neivtoniana). (Bailey.) This observation is interesting, and is the more valuable in that the vegetable foods of our indigenous fauna have very rarely been botanically determined. This plant is not endemic to Australia. Queensland."

References

Cited works

 

ramiflorus
Flora of tropical Asia
Flora of China
Flora of Queensland
Taxonomy articles created by Polbot
Taxobox binomials not recognized by IUCN
Lamiales of Asia